Caballo Island (which means "Horse Island" in Spanish) is a bluff, rocky island located at the entrance to Manila Bay in the Philippines. Caballo, along with the larger Corregidor (2 km to the north), divides the entrance to the bay into two broad and deep channels, known as the North and South Channel.

The whole island was formerly occupied by Fort Hughes, a U.S. defense fortification before World War II. It was heavily bombed during the war.

Geological history
Caballo and Corregidor Islands are believed to be the rims of the Corregidor Caldera.

In November 2014, Filipino peacekeepers from Liberia who were quarantined on the island for 21 days due to concerns about Ebola were cleared to return to the mainland. At that time West Africa was having an outbreak of the disease.

Current tenants
The island is currently occupied by the Philippine Navy and is off limits to civilians. Remains of the old fortifications, batteries and structures are left rusting in the open after it was abandoned after World War II.

See also
 List of islands in the Greater Manila Area
 List of islands of the Philippines
 Manila Bay

References

External links
Caballo Island from Pacific Wrecks.

Islands of Manila Bay
Cavite City
United States military in the Philippines
Islands of Cavite